Kennebec Intra-District Schools (KIDS) a.k.a. Regional School Unit 2 (RSU 2) is a school district headquartered in Hallowell, Maine. In addition to Hallowell it serves Dresden, Farmingdale, Monmouth, and Richmond. (Richmond voted in November, 2022 to leave the district effective July, 2023)

History
Superintendents: 

 2007-2011: Donald Siviski
 2011-2015: Virgel Hammonds
 2015-2019: Bill Zima
 August, 2019-April 2020: Cheri Towle
 April 2020-August 2020: Mary Paine (interim)
 August 2020-February, 2022: Tonya Arnold
 February, 2022-October, 2022: Matt Gilbert
 October, 2022-present: Rick Amero (interim)

Curriculum
Circa 1993 the district (then MSAD 16, which included only Hallowell and Farmingdale) received a grant to teach languages that are different from indo-European languages that were key to foreign relations and trade and selected Japanese after considering Maine's foreign trade and conducting a survey of area businesses. Its first Japanese teacher, Naoto Kobayashi, had a wife who vacationed in Maine. The program was for grades 3-7 initially but extended up to grade 12.

Schools
Middle and high schools:
 Hall-Dale Middle School & High School
 Richmond Middle School & High School 

High schools:
 Monmouth Academy

K-8:
 Monmouth Memorial School

Elementary schools:
 Dresden Elementary School
 Hall-Dale Elementary School
 Marcia Buker Elementary School (Richmond)

References

External links
 
School districts in Maine
Education in Kennebec County, Maine
Education in Lincoln County, Maine
Education in Sagadahoc County, Maine